Deepak Singhal (born in 1975) is an Indian business executive. He currently serves as the executive director and managing director of consumer business at Tolaram Group.

Early life and education 
Deepak was born in Kolkata, West Bengal, India. His mother Smt. Shakuntala Devi Singhal is a home-maker and his father Shri Ram Kumar Singhal is a businessman in Kolkata. Deepak completed his high school from St. Lawrence school in 1994 from Kolkata. He earned his degree from St. Xaviers College, Kolkata in Bachelors of Commerce and is an alumni from the institution. After his graduation, in 1998 he became an associate member of Institute of Company Secretaries of India (ICSI). In 1999, he became an associate member of Institute of Chartered Accountants of India (ICAI).

Career 
Deepak started working as a management trainee at HUL for 2 years in 1997. Following a short stint in the FMCG company, he moved to Nigeria and joined Multipro Consumer Products Limited as a finance manager in 1999. He was subsequently promoted to the role of chief operating officer. In 2006, Singhal joined Dufil Prima Foods Plc a subsidiary of Tolaram Group as the Chief Executive officer. In 2014, he joined Tolaram Group, Singapore as the managing director of consumer business and was promoted to an executive director in 2016. 

In 2016, Indomie topped Africa’s most chosen noodle brand in Kantar Worldpanel’s Brand Footprint ranking for 2016. Deepak was quoted saying “Being top in Africa in the FMCG category was no mean achievement for us especially considering this came from over 20 brands in the diaspora. This speaks to the tremendous work that has gone behind building this great global brand. It is credit to the entire team at DUFIL and our policies that we have made the top spots.”

In 2019 under the leadership of Deepak Singhal, Colgate-Palmolive company and Tolaram Group entered into a strategic joint venture to bring innovative personal care, home care products to the people of Nigeria. In 2020, Kimberly-Clark Nigeria, started a new partnership with MCPL (Multipro Consumer Products Limited) under the leadership of Deepak Singhal.

Singhal currently sits on the board of Dufil Prima Foods and Kellogg-Tolaram Nigeria Limited. Deepak Singhal has also been involved in actively promoting startups around the globe.

Personal life 
Deepak is married to Ekta Deepak Singhal and has a daughter Devina Deepak Singhal.

Awards and recognition 
In October 2022, Singhal was conferred with Order of the Federal Republic, the second highest civilian honor given by the Government of Nigeria. He was awarded by President Muhammadu Buhari.

References 

Living people
1975 births
Indian business executives
21st-century Indian businesspeople
People from West Bengal
Recipients of the Order of the Federal Republic